Clepsis micromys is a species of moth of the family Tortricidae. It is found in Syria and Lebanon.

References

Moths described in 1929
Clepsis